Finlay Gillies (born 13 February 1989) is a Scottish rugby union player. He played as a hooker for Glasgow Warriors in the PRO12.

Gillies has represented both Scotland under 20 and Scotland Sevens and has made more than 20 appearances for his club since joining in 2010.

Gillies left Glasgow at the end of the 2013–14 season.
In January 2015 Gillies was named as player-coach of Glasgow Hawks.

References

External links 
 Finlay Gillies ESPN Scrum Player Profile

Scottish rugby union players
1989 births
Rugby union hookers
Living people
Glasgow Warriors players
Edinburgh Rugby players
Scotland international rugby sevens players
Male rugby sevens players
Scotland Club XV international rugby union players